Gëzim Hyska (born 21 July 1995, in Fier) is an Albanian professional footballer who plays for Af Elbasani in the Albanian Second Division.

References

1995 births
Living people
Sportspeople from Fier
Association football forwards
Albanian footballers
KF Apolonia Fier players
KF Bylis Ballsh players
KF Himara players
KF Naftëtari Kuçovë players
FK Dinamo Tirana players
KS Albpetrol Patos players
Kategoria Superiore players
Kategoria e Parë players
Kategoria e Dytë players